The University of Abomey-Calavi is the principal public university in the west African country of Benin. The university is located in the city of Abomey-Calavi in the south of the country.

The school is composed of 19 institutions and six campuses. The university has a number of undergraduate and postgraduate programmes offered at a range of locations across the area. It is a member school of the Association of African Universities and Agence universitaire de la Francophonie.

History

The university was founded in 1970 as the Université du Dahomey.  In 1975 the name was changed to Université Nationale du Bénin.  In 2001, the university took its current name.   Enrollment at UAC was over 16,000 in 1999, including over 3,300 women.

Schools
The Université d'Abomey-Calavi is located in Abomey-Calavi. Constituent institutions of the UAC include:

 Ecole Polytechnique d’Abomey-Calavi (EPAC)
 Institut des Langues Arabes et de Cultures Islamique (ILACI)
 Institut Universitaire de Technologie (IUT) & Ecole Normale Supérieure de l’Enseignement Technique (ENSET) de Lokossa
 Institut Régional de Santé Publique (IRSP)
 Ecole Normale Supérieure (ENS)
 Ecole Nationale d’Economie Appliquée et de Management (ENEAM)
 Ecole Nationale d’Administration et de Magistrature (ENAM)
 Institut de Mathématiques et de Sciences Physiques (IMSP) (Formation Doctorale)
 Institut National de la Jeunesse de l’Education Physique et du Sport (INJEPS)
 Faculté des Sciences Agronomiques (FSA)
 Faculté des Lettres, Arts et Sciences Humaines (FLASH)
 Faculté des Sciences de la Santé (FSS)
 Faculté des Sciences Economiques (FASEG)
 Faculté de Droit et de Sciences Politiques (FADESP)
 Faculté des Sciences et Techniques (FAST)

Notable alumni 

 Yézoumi Akogo - agricultural scientist.

References

External links
 Université d'Abomey-Calavi (UAC) official site
 Université d'Abomey-Calavi (UAC) information page
INHEA (International Network for Higher Education in Africa) Benin profile

University of Abomey-Calavi
National University of Benin
Forestry education
Educational institutions established in 1970